The 1984 Thomas Cup & Uber Cup was the 13th tournament of Thomas Cup and the tenth tournament of Uber Cup, the most important badminton team competitions in the world.

Indonesia won its eighth title in the Thomas Cup, after beating China in the final round; and China won its first title in the Uber Cup, after beating England in the final.

Thomas Cup

Teams
34 teams took part in the competition. China, as defending champion, and Malaysia, as host team, skipped the Qualifications and played directly at the Final Stage.

Qualification groups

Qualifying venue: New Delhi

Qualifying venue: Hong Kong

Qualifying venue: Toronto

Qualifying venue: Ostend

Final stage

Group A

Group B

Knockout stage

Final

Uber Cup

Teams
23 teams took part in the competition, and eight teams qualified for the Final Stage.

Final stage

Group A

Group B

Knockout stage

Final

References
 tangkis.tripod.com
 Berita Harian 15 May 1984
 Berita Harian 16 May 1984
 Badmintonmuseet.dk

Thomas Uber Cup
Thomas Uber Cup
Thomas & Uber Cup
1984 in Malaysian sport
Badminton tournaments in Malaysia